Duco Hoogland (born 14 September 1984) is a Dutch politician. As a member of the Labour Party (Partij van de Arbeid) he was an MP between 8 November 2012 and 23 March 2017. Previously he was a member of the municipal council of Rotterdam from 2006 to 2010.

References

External links 
 

1984 births
21st-century Dutch politicians
Labour Party (Netherlands) politicians
Living people
Members of the House of Representatives (Netherlands)
Municipal councillors of Rotterdam
People from Lansingerland